Staka Skenderova (1831 – 26 May 1891) was a Bosnian teacher, social worker, writer and folklorist. She is credited with establishing Sarajevo's first school for girls on 19 October 1858. The following year, she became the first published woman author in modern Bosnia.

Life
Skenderova was born in 1831 in Sarajevo to parents from Prijepolje in Sandzak. Her older brother sewed for the Ottoman Army, and Skenderova learned the Turkish language at a young age and taught herself to write.

Skenderova, by permission of the Ottoman authorities, was allowed to open the first school for girls in Sarajevo in 1858. She was also the first woman teacher in Bosnia and Hercegovina.

She eventually decided to become a nun. Since Bosnia at the time had no Serbian Orthodox female monastery, she was ordained as an Eastern Orthodox nun in Jerusalem in 1870.

Death
Skenderova died in May 1891. While she was enjoying some entertainment in Ilidža, a horse-drawn carriage ploughed into the crowd and Skenderova was severely wounded. She was cared for by a friend, Paulina Irby, but died of her injuries soon after. Irby arranged the funeral and Skenderova was buried in Sarajevo.

Works
Ljetopis Bosne, 1825–1856 ("The Bosnian Chronicle, 1825–1856", 1859)

References

1831 births
1891 deaths
Serbs of Bosnia and Herzegovina
Writers from Sarajevo
Bosnia and Herzegovina women writers
19th-century Ottoman educators
19th-century poets
19th-century writers from the Ottoman Empire
Bosnia and Herzegovina women poets
19th-century women writers
Women's rights activists
Burials at Holy Archangels Cemetery, Sarajevo